Colby is an unincorporated community in Sandusky County, in the U.S. state of Ohio.

History
A post office called Colby was established in 1884, and remained in operation until 1905. Besides the post office, Colby had a station on the Nickel Plate Railroad.

References

Unincorporated communities in Sandusky County, Ohio
Unincorporated communities in Ohio